Monica Kimick (1906–1982) was a British film editor.

Selected filmography
 Aren't Men Beasts! (1937)
 Marigold (1938)
 Lucky to Me (1939)
 The Flying Squad (1940)
 The Middle Watch (1940)
 Dead Man's Shoes (1940)
 Appointment with Crime (1946)
 Spring Song (1946)
 Dual Alibi (1947)
 Uneasy Terms (1948)
 The Three Weird Sisters (1948)
 Man on the Run (1949)
 No Place for Jennifer (1950)
 Last Holiday (1950)
 Johnny on the Spot (1954)
 The Traitor (1957)
 Girls of the Latin Quarter (1960)
 Shoot to Kill (1960)

References

Bibliography
 Steve Chibnall. J. Lee Thompson. Manchester University Press, 2000.

External links

1906 births
1982 deaths
British film editors
People from Hemel Hempstead
British women film editors